Virendra Kumar Yadav is an Indian politician and a member of the 17th Legislative Assembly of Uttar Pradesh ( U.P. ) of India. He represents the Jangipur  Assembly constituency in Ghazipur district of Uttar Pradesh and is a member of the Samajwadi Party.

Early life and education
Virendra Kumar Yadav was born on 18 October 1976 in  Jaitapur mohalla of Ghazipur town. He got his early education at Ghazipur. But he got enrolled in University of Allahabad for higher studies, where he got his BA, MA and LLB degrees. Virendra Kumar Yadav got his Ph.D. from Awadhesh Pratap Singh University, Rewa. His father late Kailash Yadav was a senior leader of Samajwadi Party and a Cabinet Minister in Akhilesh Yadav government in Uttar Pradesh.

Political career
Virendra Kumar Yadav got active in politics just after completing his studies. Due to his political background he got early success in politics. He was elected Block Pramukh of Ghazipur Sadar in the year 2005. He got elected as Chairman of Zila Panchayat of Ghazipur in 2016. However, he got major success only after being elected as MLA from Jangipur assembly seat in 2017. He defeated his close contestant Ramesh Narayan Kushwaha from Bharatiya Janata Party with a margin of 3,239 votes.

Posts held
Before being elected as Member of Legislative assembly of Uttar Pradesh Virendra Kuma Yadav has held various political posts in Ghazipur district.
 Block Pramukh, Ghazipur Sadar, 2005-2012
 Chairman, Zila Panchayat, Ghazipur, 2016-2017
 District Secretary, Samajwadi Party, Ghazipur

See also
Uttar Pradesh Legislative Assembly

References

Living people
Politicians from Ghazipur
Uttar Pradesh MLAs 2017–2022
1976 births
People from Ghazipur